Andrey Martynov may refer to:

 Andrey Martynov (actor) (born 1945), Russian actor
 Andrey Vasilyevich Martynov (1879–1938), Russian entomologist and palaeontologist
 Andrey Yefimovich Martynov (1768–1826), Russian painter and engraver
 Andrei Martynov (footballer) (born 1965), retired Turkmenistani footballer